Guzmania sprucei is a species of flowering plant in the Bromeliaceae family. It is native to Costa Rica, Panama, and Colombia.

References

sprucei
Flora of Costa Rica
Flora of Panama
Flora of Colombia
Plants described in 1888
Taxa named by Édouard André
Taxa named by Lyman Bradford Smith